Agustín Lionel Allione (born 28 October 1994) is an Argentine footballer who plays as an attacking midfielder.

Club career
Allione made his debut in the Argentine Primera División playing for Vélez Sarsfield, entering the field in a 2–1 victory over Atlético Rafaela for the 2012 Clausura.

The right winger made 14 appearances during Vélez's title-winning 2012 Inicial, including four as a starter. He played a key role in the 17th fixture against All Boys, assisting Lucas Pratto in the first goal of a 2–0 victory that left his team as sole leader of the standings.

International career
Alliones played for the Argentina national under-17 football team in the 2011 South American Under-17 Football Championship and the 2011 FIFA Under-17 World Cup.

Career statistics

Honours
Vélez Sársfield
Argentine Primera División: 2012 Inicial, 2012–13 Superfinal
Supercopa Argentina: 2013

Palmeiras
Copa do Brasil: 2015
Campeonato Brasileiro Série A: 2016

Bahia
Copa do Nordeste: 2017

References

External links
 Profile at Vélez Sársfield's official website 
 Argentine Primera statistics at Fútbol XXI 
 

Living people
1994 births
Argentine footballers
Argentine expatriate footballers
Association football midfielders
Club Atlético Vélez Sarsfield footballers
Sociedade Esportiva Palmeiras players
Esporte Clube Bahia players
Rosario Central footballers
Central Córdoba de Rosario footballers
Argentine Primera División players
Campeonato Brasileiro Série A players
Footballers from Santa Fe, Argentina
Argentine expatriate sportspeople in Brazil
Expatriate footballers in Brazil